Special Collection is an extended play released in 2002 only in Japan by Garbage. It contained a number of b-sides, remixes and a live track released internationally before the release of Special Collection.

The release of Special Collection coincided with band spending eleven days promoting their third studio album Beautiful Garbage in Japan, performing four headline shows in Tokyo and Osaka; and appearing on variety show Pa-Pa-Pa-Pa-Puffy performing "Androgyny" and "Cherry Lips". The cover art for the EP is a still from the "Cherry Lips" music video.

Release

On September 27, 2001, Garbage had released Beautiful Garbage in Japan. They had promoted the album up-front of its release, but had no plans to perform in Japan until 2002, when Garbage could schedule time in the country immediately after performing eight dates in Australia and New Zealand's Big Day Out rock festival.

Special Collection featured "Use Me" and "Enough Is Never Enough", which had been written and recorded by Garbage at Smart Studios, Madison, Wisconsin, USA during the sessions for Beautiful Garbage between April, 2000 and May, 2001. Both tracks had appeared on the b-side to international pressings of "Cherry Lips". A live version of "Vow", recorded at the Roskilde Festival on June 26, 1998, was included; this track had been previously available on 1999's Version 2.0 Special Live Edition.

An urban remix of "Androgyny" by production duo The Neptunes and a brand new  remix of "Cherry Lips" by Girls Against Boys bassist Eli Janney rounded off the release. The remix of "Cherry Lips" had previously been an online-only release. Other than on Garbage:Sampler, a sampler CD issued by The Sun newspaper and Asda supermarket in the United Kingdom, this was the first physical commercial release of the track. The remix was later released internationally on "Breaking Up the Girl".

Track listing

References

External links

Garbage official website
Special Collection entry at Garbage Discography site

Garbage (band) EPs
2002 EPs
Albums produced by Butch Vig
2002 compilation albums
Sony Music Entertainment Japan EPs
Sony Music Entertainment Japan compilation albums
Garbage (band) compilation albums